The 2019 Campeonato Carioca de Futebol was the 116th edition of the top division of football in the state of Rio de Janeiro. The competition is organized by FERJ. The top four teams in the final standings of the tournament not otherwise qualified will qualify to compete in the 2020 Copa do Brasil. Additionally, the top two teams not competing in any level of the national Campeonato Brasileiro qualify for the 2020 Campeonato Brasileiro Série D.

Botafogo were the defending champions. Flamengo won their record 35th Campeonato Carioca after defeating Vasco da Gama in the final.

Bangu and Cabofriense qualified for the 2020 Campeonato Brasileiro Série D.

Participating teams

Format
The competition maintains the format of the 2017 and 2018 editions. The preliminary phase of the tournament is contested as a round-robin among the two worst-placed teams of the 2018 competition, the two best-placed teams in the 2018 relegation group, and the two teams promoted from the 2018 Série B1. The top two teams of the preliminary phase qualify for the main competition while the remaining four compete in the relegation group.

In the main competition, the twelve clubs compete across two rounds in two groups of six. The first round is the Taça Guanabara. Each group contests a round-robin and the two top-placed teams in each group qualify for the semi-final of the Taça Guanabara. In the event of a draw, the higher placed team advances to the final. The Taça Guanabara final is contested as a single match.

The second round is the Taça Rio. The two groups of six remain the same, and each team faces all six teams of the opposite group. Like the Taça Guanabara, the top two teams in each group standing qualify to a semi-final with the same format.

The Final Stage is contested as a four-team semifinal and final. The winning teams of the Taça Guanabara and Taça Rio qualify directly to the Final Stage. The best-placed teams in the overall group stage standings that did not win either round also qualify. The final is contested as a two-leg tie. In the event that the same team wins both the Taça Guanabara and Taça Rio, that team qualifies directly to a single-match final. The four other best-placed teams in the overall group stage standings compete in a four-team single-match semifinal and final to face them.

First round
Goytacaz and Resende qualified from the 2018 Campeonato Carioca relegation playoff. Nova Iguaçu and Macaé were the two lowest placed teams in the 2018 Campeonato Carioca main tournament. América and Americano were promoted from the 2018 Campeonato Carioca Série B1.

Championship round

Taça Guanabara 
On the morning of 8 February, a fire erupted at the Ninho do Urubu youth training ground of Flamengo. The fire resulted in the deaths of ten people, mostly academy players between the ages of 14 and 16 training with the club. Three other people were injured, one of them seriously injured. The initial cause of the fire was suspected to be a malfunctioning air-conditioning unit that caught fire close to 5:00.

Most of the Rio clubs suspended all football activity the day of the tragedy. The governor of the state of Rio de Janeiro declared a three-day period of mourning following the tragedy. The two Taça Guanabara semifinal matches on the following days, including the match between Flamengo and Fluminense, were postponed.

Group A

Group B

Knockout stage 

Semi-finals

Final

Taça Rio 
Group A

Group B

Knockout stage 

Semi-finals

Final

Relegation playoffs 
The Relegation Round is competed from 20 January to 23 February 2018 in double round-robin format. The top two teams qualify for the First Round of the 2020 Campeonato Carioca and the bottom two teams are relegated to the 2019 Campeonato Carioca Série B1.

Final stage

Overall table

Knockout stage 

Semi-finals

Flamengo advance to the finals with a draw as the higher seeded team.

Final

Awards

Team of the year

Top scorers

References

Campeonato Carioca seasons
Carioca